Gary Drier, known professionally as Moosie Drier (born August 6, 1964) is an American television and film actor. He is best known for his roles as Adam Landers in Oh, God! and Riley on Kids Incorporated. Drier had regular appearances on Rowan & Martin's Laugh-In and The Bob Newhart Show. Moosie has also worked as a voice actor and as a director.

Life and career
Drier was born in Chicago but raised in California. He was named after former New York Yankee Bill "Moose" Skowron, who was a friend of Drier's father. He attended U.S. Grant High School, Van Nuys, California, from which he graduated in 1982.

Drier began his television career as a recurring performer on Rowan & Martin's Laugh-In from the middle of season three to the final season in 1973, hosting a "Kid News for Kids" segment. His first dramatic role was as a deaf boy in two 1972 episodes of Lassie. During this period, Drier had movie roles in the 1972 Jack Lemmon comedy, The War Between Men and Women, the 1972 Barbra Streisand comedy Up the Sandbox, and the made-for-TV comedies  Roll, Freddy, Roll! (1974) and All Together Now (1975). In 1977 he was cast in Oh, God! starring John Denver as Jerry Landers and George Burns as God. He followed this with a prominent role in the Alan Freed screen biography American Hot Wax (1978), in which the adolescent Drier recounts his reaction to Buddy Holly's death in a broken voice.

At the age of ten, Drier began voice acting as a regular character on ABC’s 1974 These Are the Days. Other recurring television roles included "Howie Borden" on The Bob Newhart Show and on CBS’s short-lived series Executive Suite as B.J. Koslo. He made appearances on The Waltons (1973), Adam-12 (1973), Apple's Way  (1974), Police Story (3 episodes, 1974-75), Emergency! (2 episodes; 1975), Doc (1975), and Little House on the Prairie (1976), CHiPs (1980), Family Ties (1983), Kids Incorporated (1984), Diff'rent Strokes (1986), The A-Team (1986), Highway to Heaven (1986), Blacke's Magic (1986), Cagney & Lacey  (1986), Hunter (1986), Just the Ten of Us (1988), The Munsters Today (1990), and Jack & Jill (2000).

During his early acting career,  Drier also appeared in three ABC Afterschool Specials, in one of which, Hewitt's Just Different, Drier had a lead role as "Willie Arthur", the friend of the developmentally disabled title character. His late 1970s and early 1980s roles included When Every Day Was the Fourth of July (1978) and Peter Benchley's thriller Hunters of the Reef (1978). Other teen roles consist primarily of biographical dramas; most notably, Drier played a young Mickey Rooney in the 1978 Judy Garland biography Rainbow. The year 1978 also saw the filming of the made-for TV Jack Albertson vehicle Charlie and the Great Balloon Chase, which was not released until three years later, in 1981. In the 1980s made-for-TV movie Homeward Bound, he played a terminally ill young man, Bobby Seaton, who spends a last summer vacation repairing his relationship with his father, Jake, played by David Soul.

During the late 1990s, Drier accepted minor roles in the sci-fi space-ship hijack thriller Velocity Trap (1997) and Storm Trackers (1999), a thriller about a secret military weather control machine gone awry. Since 2000, he has specialized in voice-over work in such films as  Teaching Mrs. Tingle (1999), American Beauty (1999), What Lies Beneath (2000) Shrek (2001), 40 Days and 40 Nights (2002), The Shape of Things (2003), Jungle Book 2 (2003), the Lion King 1½ (2004), The Chronicles of Riddick (2004), Hauru no ugoku shiro (Eng: Howl's Moving Castle) in 2004, and Madagascar (2005).

Drier directed episodes of such series as Reba (2005) and Too Late with Adam Carolla (2005). He directed a well-received children's musical, Precious Piglet and Her Pals at the Whitefire Theatre in Sherman Oaks as well as the critically acclaimed Love Like Blue in 2007, also at the Whitefire Theatre.

Personal life

Selected filmography

Television

 1968 : Rowan & Martin's Laugh-In: Regular Performer (1971–1973)
 1972 : Lassie: Tommy
 1972 : Here Comes the Judge (TV): First child
 1972 : The Bob Newhart Show (TV): recurring character: Howie Borden (1972–77)
 1973 : The Waltons (TV) Georgie
 1973 : Adam-12 (TV): Dennis Wingard
 1974 : Apple's Way (TV):  Craig Carlson
 1974 : Runaways (TV special): Freddie Britton
 1974 : These Are the Days (TV, voice)
 1974 : Roll, Freddy, Roll! (TV) : Tommy Danton
 1975 : Police Story (TV): Mike Brenner, Kevin Prescott
 1975 : All Together Now (TV): Rafe
 1975 : Doc (TV): Michael
 1975 : Emergency! (TV) S5Ep13 as Rick Jenkins
 1976 : Little House on the Prairie (TV): Junior Barrett
 1976 : Executive Suite (TV): B.J. Koslo (a recurring character)
 1977 : Hewitt's Just Different (ABC TV Special): Willie Arthur
 1977 : It Happened at Lakewood Manor (TV): Tommy West
 1978 : When Every Day Was the Fourth of July (ABC TV Special): Howie Martin
 1978 : Rainbow Mickey Rooney
 1980 : Homeward Bound (TV): Bobby Seaton
 1980 : CHiPs (TV): Wayne
 1981 : Charlie and the Great Balloon Chase (TV movie): Morris O'Neill (produced 1978)
 1983 : Andrea's Story: A Hitchhiking Tragedy (ABC TV Special): David
 1983 : Family Ties (TV):  Arnie
 1984 : Kids Incorporated (TV): Riley (1984–1988)
 1986 : Diff'rent Strokes (TV): John
 1986 : The A-Team (TV): Bobby Sherman
 1986 : Highway to Heaven (TV):  Tim Charles Jr
 1986 : Blacke's Magic (TV):  Dale
 1986 : Cagney & Lacey (TV):  Gorham
 1986 : Hunter (TV): Phillip Epperson
 1988 : Just the Ten of Us (TV):  Warren
 1990 : The Munsters Today (TV):  The Gateman's Son
 2000 : Jack & Jill (TV)

Filmography (actor)
 1972 : The War Between Men and Women: David Kozlenko
 1972 : Up the Sandbox: Billy
 1973 : The Toy Game: Matthew Norris
 1977 : Oh, God!: Adam Landers
 1978 : American Hot Wax: Artie Moress, Buddy Holly Fanclub President
 1980 : The Hollywood Knights: Moosie
 1989 : The 'burbs: voice
 1997 : Velocity Trap: E.D. Officer
 1999 : Storm Trackers: Radar Tech

Filmography (director)
 1988 : Kids Incorporated (TV): Kahuna Kids
 2005 : Reba (TV)
 2005 : Too Late with Adam Carolla (TV)
 2009 :  The Peacemaker (TV pilot)

Theater (director/producer)
 2005: Precious Piglet and Her Pals
 2007: Love Like Blue
 2012: Cat on a Hot Tin Roof
 2013: God of Carnage
 2014: Hollywood Shorts, Lend Me a Tenor, Littlest Angel
 2015: Hollywood Shorts, Dead Pilots Society, Hound of the Baskervilles

Bibliography
 Holmstrom, John. The Moving Picture Boy: An International Encyclopaedia from 1895 to 1995. Norwich, Michael Russell, 1996, p. 349-350.

External links

1964 births
American male child actors
American male television actors
American male film actors
American television directors
American theatre directors
Living people
Male actors from Los Angeles
Grant High School (Los Angeles) alumni